A non-commercial (also spelled noncommercial) activity is an activity that does not, in some sense, involve commerce, at least relative to similar activities that do have a commercial objective or emphasis. For example, advertising-free community radio stations are typically nonprofit organizations staffed by individuals volunteering their efforts to air a wide variety of radio programming, and do not run explicit radio advertisements, included in the United States specific grouping of "non-commercial educational" (NCE) public radio stations. Some Creative Commons licenses include a "non-commercial" option, which has been controversial in definition.

References

Business terms